Ivan Domaratsky (second half of the 17th century — first half of the 18th century) was a Ukrainian composer, author of partsong concertos and liturgies.

His works were forgotten till the beginning of the 21st century when "Kyiv" Choir began to perform them in particular concertos No. 8 and No. 10. Manuscripts of his works are preserved in the Institute of Manuscripts of Vernadsky National Library of Ukraine and in collection of Saint Sophia Cathedral. Amongst them are (in Church Slavonic) «Концерт апостолу Тимофею», «Иже язиком ловец пречудний», concerto «Дева пресущественного рождает», «Избавленіє послав Господь», concerto in 8 voices «Блажен муж бояся Господа», All-Night Virgil «Блажен муж».

Notes

References
 Герасимова-Персидська Н. Хоровий концерт на Україні в XVII–XVIII ст. — К. 1978; In Ukrainian.
 Її ж. Київська колекція партесних творів кінця XVII–XVIII ст. // Українська музична спадщина. — К., 1989; In Ukrainian.
 Шуміліна О. З минулого української музичної спадщини / Партесні твори Івана Домарацького // Музыкальная культура: история и современность. — Донецк, 1997. In Ukrainian.

Ukrainian classical composers
Ukrainian Baroque composers
Classical composers of church music
17th-century classical composers
18th-century classical composers
18th-century male musicians
18th-century musicians
Male classical composers
Ukrainian people in the Russian Empire
17th-century male musicians